Đặng Văn Tới (born 20 January 1999) is Vietnamese footballer who plays as a defender for V.League 1 club Hải Phòng.

Club career
At age 18, Đặng Văn Tới was promoted from Hanoi's youth team by first-team manager Chu Đình Nghiêm. On 4 November 2020, he scored Hanoi's 600th V.League 1 goal in a 4–2 victory against Saigon at Hàng Đẫy Stadium.

In August 2022, Tới joined Haiphong on loan for the remainder of the season, linking up with former Hanoi manager Chu Đình Nghiêm. He made his club debut in 2–1 away win against Hoang Anh Gia Lai on 19 August. Tới scored his first goal for the club, netting the opener in a 1–1 home draw with Hong Linh Ha Tinh.

On 10 January 2023, Hanoi FC confirmed they had terminated their contract with Tới by mutual agreement. With Hanoi, he won 7 trophies, including two V.League 1 titles.

Style of play
Tới's preferred position is at centre-back, but he can also play as a full-back or a defensive midfielder. His playing style has been compared to that of former Vietnam international Nguyễn Huy Hoàng.

International career
Tới has represented Vietnam at under-19 and under-23 levels.

International goals

U-19

U-23

Honours
Hanoi
V.League 1: 2018, 2019
Vietnamese National Cup: 2019, 2020
Vietnamese Super Cup: 2019, 2020, 2021

Haiphong
V.League 1 runner-up: 2022

External links

References

1999 births
Living people
Vietnamese footballers
Association football defenders
V.League 1 players
Hanoi FC players
Haiphong FC players
People from Thái Bình province